Evansville High School may refer to:

Evansville High School (Wisconsin)
Evansville High School (Minnesota)

Several schools in Evansville, Indiana:
 Benjamin Bosse High School
 Central High School
 William Henry Harrison High School
 North High School 
 Francis Joseph Reitz High School  
 Mater Dei High School
 Francis Joseph Reitz Memorial High School 
 Evansville Day School 
 Evansville Signature School